Opportunity: A Journal of Negro Life was an academic journal published by the National Urban League (NUL). The journal acted as a sociological forum for the emerging topic of African-American studies and was known for fostering the literary culture during the Harlem Renaissance. It was published monthly from 1923 to 1942 and then quarterly through 1949.

History 
The studies published in the early issues of Opportunity were conducted and funded by NUL and supported the social mission of an academic journal connected with the missions of NUL and Fisk University. Topics centered on the social challenges faced by black people at the time, including access to employment, housing, sanitation and education. The journal's motto "Opportunity not Alms" describes the editorial direction, as does the journal's manifesto: 
"Opportunity is a venture inspired by a long insistent demand, both general and specific, for a journal of Negro life that would devote itself religiously to an interpretation of the social problems of the Negro population.... The policy of Opportunity will be definitely constructive. It will aim to present, objectively, facts of Negro life. It hopes, thru an analysis of these social questions, to provide a basis of understanding; encourage interracial co-operation in the working out of these problems."

While the journal was published from 1923 to 1949, its main influence on African-American literature was from 1923 to 1928. The immediate objective of Opportunity was to publish dependable data concerning black life and race relations. Editor-in-chief Charles S. Johnson wrote in the first issue of Opportunity, "Accurate and dependable facts can correct inaccurate and slanderous assertions that have gone unchallenged… and what is most important, to inculcate a disposition to see enough of interest and beauty of their own lives to rid themselves of the inferior feeling of being Negro".

Central to Opportunity's founding were two patrons: Mrs. Ruth Standish Baldwin, the white widow of a railroad magnate, and George Edmund Haynes. Haynes, a graduate of Fisk University, Yale University, and Columbia University, became the NUL's first executive secretary. The interracial character of the League's board was set from its first days; it was the template for Charles Johnson's approach to fostering interest, support, and occasion for African-American art and artists. Critics of the journal, as well as of the Harlem Renaissance, thought that Johnson's literary content may have been pandering to his white audience and patrons. Wallace Thurman said, "The results of the Renaissance have been sad rather than satisfactory, in that critical standards have been ignored and the measure of achievement has been racial rather than literary" 

Under Johnson's editorship the journal's circulation rose to 11,000 in 1928. While not as widely read as The Crisis or The Messenger, the journal was instrumental in providing breaks for new artists through its literary contests and literary parties. As the first editor-in-chief of Opportunity, Johnson immediately broadened the scope of the journal, from a purely sociological journal to a multi-faceted publication that included African-American arts. He published photographic essays, artworks, and poetry beside research studies. Powerful photojournalism illustrated the quality of life for working blacks across America.

Literary contests 
Johnson is credited for organizing and promoting literary parties, which successfully brought together African-American artists and white patrons of money and letters. From 1924 to 1927, Johnson sponsored three literary contests. Eric Walrond, a regular contributor to the journal, introduced Johnson to Harlem's notorious gambling kingpin, Casper Holstein. Holstein became a major patron of Opportunity and the journal's literary contests, the first of which received 732 entries. The literary contest became essential to the promotion of the Harlem Renaissance's writers and artists. The May 1925 issue of Opportunity lists a number of prizewinners who went on to enjoy successful publishing careers: Claude McKay, Zora Neale Hurston, Langston Hughes, Countee Cullen, Sterling Brown, and Franklin Frazier. From 1925 to 1927 Johnson provided over three contest award dinners where on average almost 350 black artists and white patrons and publishers attended. According to Arna Bontemps, contributor to Opportunity, these events provided enthusiasm for African-American artists, increased white patronage, and provided exposure to the major New York City publishers (Knopf, MacMillan, and Harpers).

After 1928, when Johnson accepted the presidency of Fisk University, chief editors of the journal included Elmer Anderson Carter (October 1928–January 1945), Madeline L. Aldridge (January 1945–June 1947), and Dutton Ferguson (July 1947–January 1949). Under Carter's editorship, the journal resumed its focus for publishing sociological studies of African Americans and continued with this purpose until it ceased publication in 1949.

Further reading
 Gardiner, George L, A Bibliography of Charles Spurgeon Johnson's Published Writings, Nashville, Tenn.: Fisk University, 1970. Print.
 Johnson, Charles. "The Rise of the Negro Magazine." Journal of Negro History. 13.1 (1928): 7-21. Print.
 Gilpin, Patrick, "Charles S. Johnson: An Intellectual Biography," PhD dissertation, Vanderbilt University Press, 1973. Print
 Witalec, Janet. The Harlem Renaissance: A Gale Critical Companion. Gale Group, 2002. 1500. Print.

References

Defunct journals of the United States
Publications established in 1923
Publications disestablished in 1949
Sociology journals